= Last Kingdom =

- Developer(s): Netamin
- Publisher(s): Netamin
- Platform(s): PC
- Release: July 2000
- Genre(s): MMORPG

Last Kingdom is a video game developed and published by Netamin.com for the PC.

== Gameplay ==
Last Kingdom is an MMORPG in which players start as peasants and gain experience points to progress in character classes.

== Reception ==
Carla Harker reviewed the PC version of the game for Next Generation, rating it one star out of five, and stated that "It's free to try, but who'd want to pay for this mess?"

== Reviews ==
- Computer Games Magazine #124
- https://web.archive.org/web/20010528194548/http://stratics.com/content/news/arc9-2000.shtml
- https://www.eurogamer.net/articles/article_29391
- https://web.archive.org/web/20010215122948/http://www.netamin.com/Netaminsite/Home/homepage.asp
- https://web.archive.org/web/20010215122232/http://www.netamin.com/NetaminSite/Beta_LastKingdom/lastKingdom_home.html
- https://web.archive.org/web/20010611194606/http://download.netamin.com/manual.pdf
- https://web.archive.org/web/20001012063336/http://www.netamin.net/grand_opening.asp
- https://web.archive.org/web/20010528194548/http://stratics.com/content/news/arc9-2000.shtml
- https://web.archive.org/web/20010420152008/http://www.fileplanet.com/index.asp?file=50897
